Cyperus zollingerioides is a species of sedge that is endemic to Western Cape province in South Africa.

The species was first formally described by the botanist Charles Baron Clarke in 1906.

See also
List of Cyperus species

References

zollingerioides
Taxa named by Charles Baron Clarke
Plants described in 1906
Flora of South Africa